The Latin Psalters are the translations of the Book of Psalms into the Latin language. They are the a resource used in the Liturgy of the Hours and other forms of the canonical hours in the Latin liturgical rites of the Catholic Church.

These translations are typically placed in a separate volume or a section of the breviary called the psalter, in which the psalms are arranged to be prayed at the canonical hours of the day. In the Middle Ages, psalters were often lavish illuminated manuscripts, and in the Romanesque and early Gothic period were the type of book most often chosen to be richly illuminated.

Versions
The Latin Church has a diverse selection of more or less different full translations of the psalms. Three of these translations, the Romana, Gallicana, and juxta Hebraicum, have been traditionally ascribed to Jerome, the author of the Latin Vulgate; however, the Romana has not been produced by Jerome. Two other translations, the Pian and Nova Vulgata versions, were made in the 20th century.

Many of these translations are actually quite similar to each other, especially in style: the Roman, Ambrosian, and Mozarabic psalters have relatively few differences between them, such that the same settings can generally be applied to sing all three. Related too is Jerome's Gallican psalter (versio gallicana), made between 386 and 389, which was translated from the Greek text of the Hexaplar Septuagint. Later, Jerome translated the book of psalms from Hebrew, this translation is called the versio juxta Hebraicum. The Nova Vulgata psalter (1979), though stylistically similar to these, diverges rather more from these traditional psalters insofar as it more closely follows the Hebrew Masoretic text. Two of these psalters stand apart as independent translations from the Hebrew: Jerome's juxta Hebraicum and the Pian version (1945).

Versio Vetus Latina

Also called the Psalterium Vetus, the psalter of the Old Latin Bible.  Quotations from the Psalms in Latin authors show that a number of related but distinct Old Latin recensions were circulating in the mid-4th century.  These had by then substantially replaced the older Latin 'Cyprianic Psalter', a recension found in the works of Cyprian of Carthage that only survived in the 4th-century writings of the Donatists; and are all thought to be revisions of a lost common early 3rd-century version.

A 12th-century Latin bible from Monte Cassino (Ms. Cas. 557) preserves, alongside the Roman, Gallican and Iuxta Hebraeos psalters, a fourth complete version of the psalms extensively corrected with reference to the columns of the Hexapla Greek, possibly using a columnar transcription of the Hexapla psalter similar to that surviving in Milan.  The underlying Latin text for this manuscript is believed to correspond with an early 3rd-century 'Cyprianic Psalter'.

Versio Ambrosiana
This is the version used in the Ambrosian rite for use in Milan.

Versio Mozarabica
This is the version used in the Mozarabic rite for use in Toledo.

Versio Romana
The Roman Psalter, called also the Versio Romana or Psalterium Romanum, was traditionally identified with Jerome's first revision of the psalms completed in 384; which was thought to have been made from the Versio Vetus Latina, with cursory corrections to bring it more in line with the psalms in the common Greek text of the Septuagint.  More recent scholarship rejects this theory.  The Roman Psalter is indeed one of five known revised versions of the mid-4th century Old Latin Psalter; but, compared with the four others the revisions in the Roman Psalter are in clumsy Latin and signally fail to follow Jerome's known translational principles, especially in failing to correct harmonised readings.  Nevertheless, it is clear from Jerome's correspondence (especially in the long and detailed Epistle 106) that he was familiar with this psalter text, albeit without ever admitting any responsibility for it; and consequently it is assumed that the surviving Versio Romana  represents the minimally revised Roman text as Jerome had found it.

The Roman version is retained in the Roman Missal and is found in the writings of Pope Gregory the Great, but for the Divine Office, it was, from the 9th century onwards, replaced throughout most of the west by Jerome's so-called "Gallican" version. It lived on in England where it continued to be used until the Norman Conquest and in  Saint Peter's Basilica in Rome and fragments of it were used in the Offices at St. Mark's Cathedral in Venice from at least 1609 until 1807.

Versio Gallicana

The Versio Gallicana or Psalterium Gallicanum, also known as the Gallican Psalter (so called because it became spread in Gaul from the 9th century onward) has traditionally been considered Jerome's second Latin translation of the Psalms, which he made from the Greek of the Hexapla between 386 and 389. This became the psalter of the Sixto-Clementine Vulgate bible.

This most influential psalter has a distinctive style which is attributable to its origins as a translation of the Septuagint. Following the Septuagint, it eschews anthropomorphisms. For instance, the term rock is applied to God numerous times in the Hebrew Psalter, but the Latin term petra does not occur as an epithet for God in the gallicana. Instead more abstract words like refugium, "refuge"; locus munitus, "place of strength"; or adiutor, "helper" are used.

Versio juxta Hebraicum 
The versio juxta Hebraicum or versio iuxta Hebraeos was the last made by Jerome. It is often informally called the "Hebrew Psalter" despite being written in Latin. Rather than just revise the Gallicana, he translated these psalms anew from the Hebrew, using pre-Masoretic manuscripts ca. 392. This psalter was present in the Bibles until Alcuin's reforms linked to the Carolingian liturgical reform: Alcuin replaced the versio juxta Hebraicum by a version of the psalter used in Gaul at the time. The latter became known as the Gallican psalter (see the section above), and it superseded the versio juxta Hebraicum. The versio juxta Hebraicum was kept in Spanish manuscripts of the Vulgate long after the Gallican psalter had supplanted it elsewhere. The versio juxta Hebraicum was never used in the liturgy.

Versio Piana

Under Pius XII, a new Latin translation of the psalms, known as Versio Piana, Psalterium Vaticanum or Novum Psalterium, was published by the Pontifical Biblical Institute.  This version is sometimes called the Bea psalter after its author, Augustin Bea. In 1945, its use was officially permitted by the pope through the motu proprio In cotidianis precibus, but not required.

Versio Nova Vulgata

In 1969, a new psalter was published which translated the Masoretic text while keeping much of the poetry and style of the Gallican psalter. The 1969 psalter deviates from the previous versions in that it follows the Masoretic numbering of the psalms, rather than the Septuagint enumeration. It is the psalter used in the edition of the Roman Office published in 1986.

Comparison
Below is a comparison of Jerome's two versions of the first three verses of the psalm Venite exsultemus (psalm 94 (95)) with the Vetus Latina, Ambrosiana, Mozarabica, Romana, Gallicana, and Hebraicum versions, as well as the two 20th century versions (Piana and Nova Vulgata), which illustrates some of the distinctions noted above:

<div style="float:left; width:100%;clear: left;">

Enumeration
The enumeration of the psalms differs in the Nova Vulgata from that used in the earlier versions. The earlier versions take their enumeration from the Greek Septuagint. The Versio Nova Vulgata takes its enumeration from the Hebrew Masoretic Text.

 Psalms 9 and 10 in the Nova Vulgata are together as Psalm 9 in the older versions
 Psalms 114 and 115 in the Nova Vulgata are Psalm 113 in the older versions
 Psalms 114 and 115 in the older versions appear as Psalm 116 in the Nova Vulgata
 Psalms 146 and 147 in the older versions form Psalm 147 in the Nova Vulgata
 Psalms 10-112 and 116-145 (132 out of the 150) in the older versions are numbered lower by one than the same psalm in the Nova Vulgata.
 Psalms 1-8 and 148-150, 11 psalms in total, are numbered the same in both the old versions and the new one.

Divisions

Apart from the schemata described below, it was customary in medieval psalters to divide the text of the psalms in numerical sequence into sections or divisions, the start of which were typically marked by a much larger and more decorated initial letter than for the other psalms. The "B" of Psalm 1, Beatus Vir, usually was the most enlarged and decorated, and often those two words occupied a full page, the rounded shape of the letter being very suitable for decoration. These are often referred to as "Beatus initials". In Early Medieval psalters a three-fold division with decorated letters at Psalms 1, 51, 101 was typical, but by the Gothic period French psalters were often divided into eight sections, and English ones into ten, at Psalms 1, 26, 38, 51, 52, 68, 80, 97, 101 and 109.

Schemata
A scheme (Latin schema, plural schemata) is an arrangement of all or most of the psalms for distribution to the various canonical hours. In addition to the psalms proper, these schemata typically include psalm-like canticles from other books of the Bible. Historically, these schemata have distributed the entire 150 psalms with added canticles over a period of one week, although the 1971 Liturgy of the Hours omits a few psalms and some verses and distributes the remainder over a 4-week cycle. Some of the more important schemes are detailed below.

In addition to the rotating schema, the order of service has ordinary texts that are fixed. These include the Invitatory, normally psalm 94(95), and the canticles Benedictus Dominus, Magnificat, and Nunc dimittis.

Schema of Pope Pius V
As commissioned by the Council of Trent, St. Pius V published a reform of the Roman Breviary in 1568 for use by the  churches of the Roman rite. The scheme used in this breviary differs in some details from the Scheme of St. Benedict, but follows its overall pattern. Some obvious differences are that Sunday had three nocturns, while the other days had but one; Lauds and the daytime hours had less variation in the Psalmody; and Compline added Psalm 30. In addition, while St. Benedict made heavy use of "divided" Psalms, the Roman rite divided only Psalm 118.

This scheme was used by many religious orders as well, such as the Dominicans (of which Pope Pius V was a member).

Schema of Pope Pius X

In 1911, Pope Pius X reformed the Roman Breviary, re-arranging the psalms into a new scheme so that there was less repetition and so that each day of the week had approximately the same amount of psalm-chanting.

Psalm 94 (the Invitiatory) was recited every day at the beginning of Matins. With Lauds, there are two schemes. Lauds I were celebrated on all Sundays and ferias, except from Septuagesima until Palm Sunday inclusive, and on feasts celebrated at any time of the year. Lauds II, having a more penitential character, were used on the Sundays and ferias of Advent until the vigil of Christmas and from Septuagesima until Monday of Holy Week inclusive. They were also used on vigils of the second and third class outside of Paschaltide. When Lauds II were said, the omitted psalm was said as a fourth psalm at Prime, in order to include all 150 psalms each week during penitential seasons; on Sundays with Lauds II, the scheme became 92, 99, 118i, and 118ii. On feasts which used the Sunday psalms, 53, 118i, and 118ii were said at Prime. On Sundays after Epiphany and Pentecost, the Athanasian Creed was said fourth at Prime; it was omitted if a commemoration of a Double feast or of an octave occurred.

Schema of Pope Paul VI

In 1971 with the release of a new edition of the Divine Office under Pope Paul VI, the Liturgia Horarum, a new schema was introduced which distributed 147 of the 150 psalms across a four-week cycle.

Psalterium Monasticum
The Psalterium Monasticum is a psalter produced by the monks of Solesmes Abbey in 1981 "[t]o allow monks and nuns to celebrate in Gregorian chant" the Benedictine Office reformed by Vatican II. It contains all 150 psalms and uses the Latin of the Nova Vulgata. It contains four schemas (A, B, C, D).

Notes

See also 

Vulgate
Sixto-Clementine Vulgate
Septuagint
Vetus Latina
Beatus vir

References

External links 
Latin psalters

Vetus Latina psalter (pp. 9–293) Latin text
Breviarium Ambrosianum Latin text
Psalterium Romanum Latin text
Psalterium Gallicanum Latin text
Psalterium juxta Hebraicum (also available here) Latin text
Psalterium Mozarabicum Latin text
Psalterium Pianum Latin text
Psalterium Neo-Vulgatum Latin text
Liturgia Horarum Online A very nice, practical and versatile version to read the psalter online.
Liberpsalmorum.info A list of the different Latin psalters from the Vetus Latina to the Nova Vulgata.

Miscellaneous

Theo Keller's comparison of the psalm De profundis, giving the Roman, Gallican, Pian, and Neo-Vulgate versions of psalm 129.
Fr. John Zuhlsdorf's comparison of the psalm Beatus vir, giving the Roman, Gallican, Neo-vulgate, Pian, and Ambrosian versions of psalm 1.
Theo Keller's tables of historical psalter schemas. Includes the four choices of the Psalterium Monasticum above

Further reading 

 

Psalters
Latin liturgical rites
Vulgate
Vetus Latina